Gilbert Henry Heathcote-Drummond-Willoughby, 1st Earl of Ancaster,  (1 October 1830 – 24 December 1910), known as 2nd Baron Aveland from 1867 to 1888 and as 25th Baron Willoughby de Eresby from 1888 to 1892, was a British Liberal politician and court official.

Early life
Born Gilbert Henry Heathcote, he was the son of Gilbert Heathcote, 1st Baron Aveland, and Clementina Elizabeth Drummond-Willoughby, 24th Baroness Willoughby de Eresby. He was educated at Harrow and Trinity College, Cambridge.

Career
In 1852, Ancaster was elected to the House of Commons for Boston, a seat he held until 1856, and then represented Rutland until he succeeded his father as second Baron Aveland in 1867. In 1872, he assumed by Royal licence the additional surnames of Willoughby and Drummond.  He held the office of Deputy Lord Great Chamberlain from 1871 to 1901 and was admitted to the Privy Council in 1880.

In 1888, he succeeded his mother as twenty-fifth Baron Willoughby de Eresby and four years later he was created Earl of Ancaster, in the County of Lincoln. This was a revival of the title held by his maternal ancestors the Dukes of Ancaster and Kesteven.

Personal life

Lord Ancaster married Lady Evelyn Elizabeth Gordon, daughter of Charles Gordon, 10th Marquess of Huntly, in 1863. Together, they were the parents of ten children:
 Lady Evelyn Clementina Heathcote-Drummond-Willoughby (1864–1924), married Maj.-Gen. Sir Henry Ewart, 1st Baronet of White House.
 Lady Margaret Mary Heathcote-Drummond-Willoughby (1866–1956), married in 1902 Gideon Macpherson Rutherford, barrister-at-law.
 Hon. Gilbert Heathcote-Drummond-Willoughby (1867–1951), succeeded as 2nd Earl of Ancaster.
 Lady Nina Heathcote-Drummond-Willoughby (1869–1940).
 Brig.-Gen. Hon. Charles Strathavon Heathcote-Drummond-Willoughby (1870–1949), fought in the Second Boer War and World War I.
 Lt.-Col. Hon. Claud Heathcote-Drummond-Willoughby (1872–1950), fought in the Second Boer War and World War I, and was a Conservative politician.
 Lady Cecilie Heathcote-Drummond-Willoughby (1874– ) married Thomas Clarence Edward Goff.
 Lady Alice Heathcote-Drummond-Willoughby (1876–1951).
 Lady Mary Adelaide Heathcote-Drummond-Willoughby (1878–1960), married the 14th Earl of Dalhousie and became the mother of both the 15th and the 16th Earl.
 Lt-Cdr Hon. Peter Robert Heathcote-Drummond-Willoughby, RN (1885–1914), naval officer killed in the sinking of HMS Monmouth at the Battle of Coronel.

Lord Ancaster died on 24 December 1910, aged 80, and was succeeded in his titles by his eldest son. His tomb stands alongside that of his uncle in the churchyard at Edenham in Lincolnshire; together the tombs constitute a Grade II listed building.

Notes

References
 Burke's Peerage, Baronetage and Knightage, 100th Edn, London, 1953.
Gilbert Heathcote-Drummond-Willoughby at thepeerage.com

External links
 
 

1830 births
1910 deaths
25
People educated at Harrow School
Alumni of Trinity College, Cambridge
Liberal Party (UK) MPs for English constituencies
Gilbert
Gilbert
Eldest sons of British hereditary barons
Members of the Privy Council of the United Kingdom
UK MPs 1852–1857
UK MPs 1857–1859
UK MPs 1859–1865
UK MPs 1865–1868
UK MPs who inherited peerages
UK MPs who were granted peerages
Presidents of the Marylebone Cricket Club
Peers of the United Kingdom created by Queen Victoria